The Syriac Catholic Patriarchal Eparchy of Beirut is a Syriac Catholic Church ecclesiastical territory or eparchy of the Catholic Church in Lebanon. The Syriac Catholic Patriarch of Antioch's cathedra is found in the eparchy in the episcopal see of Beirut, the capital of Lebanon.

History 
It was established in 1819. Generally, the Syriac Catholic Patriarch of Antioch will administer the Eparchy of Beirut as its ordinary and sole episcopal officer, but he may also appoint a proper eparch.

Pope Benedict XVI visited the eparchy in September 2012.

Episcopal ordinaries
Incomplete list

Eparchs (Bishops) of Beirut
 Efrem Rahmani (1890.09.20 – 1894.05.01), formerly Titular Archbishop of Edessa in Osrhoëne of the Syriacs (1887.10.02 – 1890.09.20); later Archeparch (Archbishop) of Aleppo of the Syriacs (Syria) (1894.05.01 – 1898.10.09), Eparch (Bishop) of Mardin and Amida of the Syriacs (Turkey) (1898.10.09 – 1929.05.07), Patriarch of Antioch of the Syriacs (Lebanon) as Ignace Dionisio Efrem II Rahmani ([1898.10.09] 1898.11.28 – death 1929.05.07) Apostolic Administrator Théophile Georges Kassab (2008.02.02 – 2009.01.20), while Metropolitan Archeparch of Homs of the Syriacs (Syria) ([1999.05.08] 1999.12.18 – 2013.10.22)

See also
 Syrian Catholic Patriarchal Exarchate of Lebanon

Source and External links 
 GCatholic with incumbent bio links

Beirut
Eastern Catholicism in Lebanon